Sam Zimbalist (March 31, 1901 – November 4, 1958) was a Russian Empire born American film producer and film editor.

Early life
Born to a Ukrainian Jewish family, he arrived to the US in August 1914.

He began his career at 16 as an office boy to Richard A. Rowland, who was president of Metro Studios, and studied film editing. He began to do some editing in his spare time when films needed to be trimmed to meet censorship requirements.

He became friendly with actress Alla Nazimova who was under contract to Metro and told her of his desire to be a full editor. She invited him out to Hollywood in 1920 to become second assistant editor on her films. In 1923 when Nazimova's contract with Metro ended, he returned with her to New York and became her assistant stage manager on Broadway.

Film editor
In 1924 Zimbalist returned to Los Angeles seeking film work. Metro pictures had merged with Sam Goldwyn's company to become MGM. Zimbalist went to work for them as an assistant editor and soon worked his way up to full editor. He edited the 1925 version of The Wizard of Oz. Among the films he edited at MGM were Lon Chaney's While the City Sleeps (1928), Alias Jimmy Valentine, the studio's first sound film, and The Broadway Melody (1929), the first sound musical.

Film producer
He was promoted to assistant producer in 1929 working for Hunt Stromberg and became a producer on his own in 1936 with Married Before Breakfast.

He produced films including Thirty Seconds Over Tokyo (1944), the story of the Doolittle Raiders, King Solomon's Mines (1950) and Quo Vadis (1951). The latter two both received Academy Award nominations for Best Picture. Quo Vadis was MGM's second-highest-grossing film at the time behind Gone With the Wind and MGM's most profitable film of the era with worldwide rentals of $23 million on a cost of $7 million.

Based on the success of Quo Vadis, he was made producer of MGM's most elaborate production until that time, the 1959 epic Ben-Hur.

Death
Zimbalist collapsed suddenly of a heart attack on set in Rome, Italy, during filming of Ben-Hur. He was taken to his villa where he died.

He was buried at the Hillside Memorial Park in Culver City, California. He received a posthumous Oscar for the film, and remains the only person to ever posthumously receive a Best Picture award. His Oscar was accepted by his wife Mary Zimbalist, who made a speech in honor of her late husband. Ben-Hur was even more profitable than Quo Vadis becoming MGM's second-highest-grossing film at the time (again, behind Gone With the Wind) making Zimbalist the producer of the second- and third-highest-grossing films at the studio.

He left an estate of $500,000.

Personal life
He married Margaret C. Donovan in 1924. They divorced in 1950. Zimbalist then married Mary Taylor, a former fashion model and actress, in 1952.

Selected filmography
The Wizard of Oz (1925) – editor
The Dome Doctor (1925) (short) – editor
The Cloudhopper (1925) (short) – editor
 The Unchastened Woman (1925) – editor
 Johnny Get Your Hair Cut (1927) – editor
 The Bugle Call (1927) – editor
Foreign Devils (1927) – editor
Buttons (1927) – editor
Baby Mine (1928) – editor
The Smart Set (1928) – editor
Diamond Handcuffs (1928) – editor
The Adventurer (1928) – editor
 While the City Sleeps (1928) – editor
Alias Jimmy Valentine (1928) – editor
Gus Edwards' Song Revue (1929) (short) – editor
The Broadway Melody (1929) – editor
Song of the Roses (1929) (short) – editor
Our Modern Maidens (1929) – editor
Tarzan Escapes (1936) – associate producer
 Married Before Breakfast (1937) – producer
 London by Night (1937) – producer
 Navy Blue and Gold (1937) – producer
 Paradise for Three (1938) – producer
 The Crowd Roars (1938) – producer
 Tarzan Finds a Son (1939) – producer
 Lady of the Tropics (1939) – producer
 These Glamour Girls (1939) – producer
 Boom Town (1940) – producer
 Tortilla Flat (1940) – producer
 30 Seconds Over Tokyo (1944) – producer
 Adventure (1945) – producer
 Killer McCoy (1947) – producer
 Side Street (1949) – producer
 King Solomon's Mines (1950) – producer
 Too Young to Kiss (1951) – producer
 Quo Vadis? (1951) – producer
 Mogambo (1953) – producer
 Beau Brummell (1954) – producer
 Tribute to a Bad Man (1956) – producer
 The Catered Affair (1956) – producer
 The Barretts of Wimpole Street (1957) – producer
 I Accuse! (1959) – producer
 Ben Hur (1959) – producer

Unmade films
adaptation of Robinson Crusoe (1947) with Spencer Tracy and later Stewart Granger

References

External links
 
 Allmovie bio

1900s births
1958 deaths
Producers who won the Best Picture Academy Award
American film producers
American film editors
20th-century American Jews
Golden Globe Award-winning producers
20th-century American businesspeople
Burials at Hillside Memorial Park Cemetery
Emigrants from the Russian Empire to the United States